Giuliano Castagnola (1572 – 21 December 1620) was a Catholic prelate who served as Bishop of Nebbio (1612–1620).

Biography
Giuliano Castagnola was born in La Spezia, Italy in 1572.
He was Doctor in utroque iure (Civil and Canon Law), and was Rector of the Parish of San Lorenzo in montibus in Rome.
On 19 November 1612, he was appointed during the papacy of Pope Paul V as Bishop of Nebbio.
On 30 November 1612, he was consecrated bishop by Giovanni Garzia Mellini, Cardinal-Priest of Santi Quattro Coronati with Giovanni Battista Salvago, Bishop of Luni e Sarzana, and Antonio Seneca, Bishop of Anagni, serving as co-consecrators. 
He served as Bishop of Nebbio until his death on 21 December 1620.

References 

17th-century Italian Roman Catholic bishops
Bishops appointed by Pope Paul V
1572 births
1620 deaths